Sarsfield Barracks is an Irish Army Barracks in Limerick city. It houses both Permanent and Reserve Defence Forces of the Irish Defence Forces.

History
The barracks, originally called New Barracks, were built on land leased from a Mr J.T. Monsell and were completed in 1795. The barracks were handed over to the Irish Army following Irish Independence and renamed Sarsfield Barracks after Patrick Sarsfield, a Jacobite, in 1926. The barracks remain in use and are currently the headquarters of 12th Infantry battalion.

See also
 List of Irish military installations

References

Barracks in the Republic of Ireland
Irish military bases
Buildings and structures in Limerick (city)